In molecular biology, Small nucleolar RNA ACA49 is a snoRNA, originally cloned in 2004 from a HeLa cell extract immunoprecipitated with an anti-GAR1 antibody. It has no identified target RNA.

References

External links 
 
 

Small nuclear RNA